Kuligin is a Russian male surname. Its feminine counterpart is Kuligina. Notable people with the surname include:

Aleksandr Kuligin (born 1991), Russian Paralympic footballer

Russian-language surnames